Julia Alfrida Ridderdal (born 25 June 1995) is a Swedish singer and songwriter.

Career
In 2018, Alfrida released her debut single titled "Sweet Escape". In 2019, Alfrida released a single, "HER", leading her to perform at the Stockholm Pride and Copenhagen Pride.

In 2020, Alfrida participated in the competition P4 Nästa with the song "Dark Doom", placing sixth. Despite not winning, Alfrida was given a wildcard to participate in the music competition Melodifestivalen 2021. She participated with the song "Rich", co-written by her, along with Jimmy Jansson and Melanie Wehbe. However, the song failed to qualify from the semi finals.

Influences
Alfrida's influences include Lady Gaga, Tove Lo, Billie Eilish and Charli XCX.

Personal life
Alfrida identifies herself as queer and a lesbian, stating that Eurovision Song Contest and Melodifestivalen are as a "part of coming out journey".

Discography

Extended plays

Singles

See also
 Jimmy Jansson

References

Living people
1995 births
Swedish women singers
Swedish pop singers
Swedish lesbian musicians
Swedish LGBT singers
Lesbian singers
Queer singers
English-language singers from Sweden
20th-century Swedish LGBT people
21st-century Swedish LGBT people
Melodifestivalen contestants of 2021